Vladimír Vetchý (born 1949) is a former Czech politician for Czech Social Democratic Party. He served as defense minister from 22 July 1998 to 3 May 2001 in Miloš Zeman's Cabinet. Vetchý was criticized for failing to meet targets relating to the Czech Republic's NATO accession, leading to his dismissal.

References

1949 births
Living people
Czech Social Democratic Party Government ministers
Defence ministers of the Czech Republic
Masaryk University alumni
People from Třebíč